The 2021–22 Rugby Africa Cup, which doubled as Qualifying for the 2023 Rugby World Cup for Africa began in June 2021, where teams competed for one direct qualification spot into the final World Cup tournament and for one place in the final Qualification Tournament.

Format
The World Cup qualification process doubled as a new two-year format for the Rugby Africa Cup.

Qualifying began with a round robin repechage tournament between Burkina Faso, Cameroon, and Burundi (the three lowest ranked teams at the time in Africa). The winner of this tournament advanced to the next round - Africa Cup 2021.

The second stage saw the remaining 12 teams divided into 4 groups of 3 where they played a single round-robin tournament to decide the pool winners. The top-2 teams after this round then progressed to the final stage of the African Qualification process, with seeding determining who played who in a knock-out competition in 2022.

Round 3 saw a phased knock-out competition; consisting of 4 quarter-finals, 2 semi-finals and a final, with the winner of the final qualifying as Africa 1. The runner-up advanced to the final Qualification Tournament as Africa 2.

Entrants
Fourteen participants entered the Africa qualifiers in a bid to join South Africa (already qualified due to top 3 finish in the pool stages in 2019) at the 2023 Rugby World Cup. Three teams begin play in Round 1, with eleven more in Round 2. The same seeding from the cancelled 2019–20 Rugby Africa Cup is used for the group stage. Team World rankings taken prior to first Africa qualifying match.

Teams in bold have previously competed in a Rugby World Cup.

Round 1: Rugby Africa Cup Repechage
The first round was a round-robin tournament held from 5–13 June 2021 in Ouagadougou, Burkina Faso.

Round 2: 2021 Africa Cup
Round 2 will consist of four pools of three teams, competing from 1–18 July 2021. The top two teams in each pool will advance to Round 3.

Pool A
Originally, this pool was meant be hosted by Namibia at the Hage Geingob Rugby Stadium in Windhoek. However, due to restrictions in Namibia, Rugby Africa moved the location of this pool to the Ivory Coast.

Pool B
All matches of Pool B was hosted in Nairobi, Kenya.

Pool C
All matches for Pool C was hosted in Kampala, Uganda.

Pool D
All matches of Pool D were due to be hosted in Monastir, Tunisia, however due to the escalating COVID-19 situation in Tunisia, the group was moved to Zimbabwe. At the same time, Tunisia also withdrew from the competition meaning Zimbabwe and Burkina Faso gained automatic progression to the next stage of the qualification process. A 2-game match up between the two sides confirmed seedings for the next stage.

Round 3: 2022 Africa Cup
The 2022 Africa Cup acted as the third and final round of the African Qualification process, whereby the winner of an 8-team straight knockout competition qualified for the World Cup as Africa 1. The runner-up advanced to the final Qualification Tournament as Africa 2. This stage began with 4 quarter finals, followed by semi-finals and culminating in a final. 

All matches were played in France across the Stade Delort in Marseille, and Stade Maurice David in Aix-en-Provence

Teams
Rankings as of 27 June 2022 prior to tournament start date

Bracket

Quarter-finals

Semi-finals

Third place play-off

Final: Africa 1 play-off

Ranking matches

5–8th place play-offs

Semi-finals

7th/8th play-off

5th/6th play-off

See also
Africa Cup
Rugby Africa

References

External links
 Rugby World Cup Official Site

2021-22
2021 rugby union tournaments for national teams
2022 rugby union tournaments for national teams
2021 in African rugby union
2022 in African rugby union
Africa qualification
2023